Kendriya Vidyalaya, No.1, Air Force Station, Jalahalli West, Bangalore, India is a school run by the Kendriya Vidyalaya Sangathan, an autonomous body formed by the Ministry of Human Resource Development, Government of India, New Delhi. Started in 1964, the Vidyalaya has classes from I to XII with an enrolment of 2300 with Science and Commerce streams at the Plus-Two level. The principal of the school is Mr. Ravindra Devadiga. 

The Vidyalaya is affiliated to the Central Board of Secondary Education and follows the 10+2 pattern of education. Apart from the teaching learning process, the students take part in co-curricular activities, sports and games, club activities, work experience, Scouts and Guides, National Cadet Corps (NCC), computer education, vocational training, adventure programmes and value education.
The Vidyalaya also feature famous butterfly photographer Ashok Sengupta. This school has produced fantastic results on several occasions.

See also 
Kendriya Vidyalaya Sangathan
List of Kendriya Vidyalayas

References

External links 

Kendriya Vidyalaya Sangathan

1964 establishments in Mysore State
Kendriya Vidyalayas in Bangalore
Educational institutions established in 1964